Denmark made its Paralympic Games début at the 1968 Summer Paralympics in Tel Aviv with a delegation of eight competitors, in swimming and table tennis. The country has participated in every subsequent edition of the Summer Paralympics, and in every edition of the Winter Games since 1980.

Danish athletes have won a total of 293 Paralympic medals, of which 99 are gold. All but six of these have been won at the Summer Games. Denmark won its first medals in 1976, when Jorn Nielsen notably took three gold medals in track and field. The country was most successful in the 1980s, when it recorded its greatest medal hauls at the Summer Games, and in the 1990s - the only decade during which it won medals at the Winter Paralympics.

Among Denmark's most successful athletes are Ingrid Lauridsen, who swept up six gold medals in athletics in 1984, followed by two more in 1988; Anders Christensen, winner of five gold medals in swimming in 1988; and Connie Hansen, who won a total of nine gold medals in athletics in 1988 and 1992.

Denmark's Winter Paralympics medallists are:
 Lars Nielsen: silver in the Men's Giant Slalom (B2 category) in 1992
 Anne-Mette Bredahl-Christensen: gold in the Women's 7.5 km Free Technique (B1-3) in biathlon, and bronze in two cross-country skiing events, in 1994; then gold in the Women's 5 km Free Technique (B1) in cross-country skiing and bronze in the 7.5 km Free Technique (B1) in biathlon, in 1998.

Medal tallies

Summer Paralympics

Winter Paralympics

See also
 Denmark at the Olympics

References